The 2010 gang rapes in Cleveland, Texas were a series of acts of sexual violence committed by a group of adult men and teenage boys on an underage girl in the town of Cleveland, in Texas, USA.

Background
The victim was the eleven-year old daughter of Mexican immigrants, living in Cleveland, Texas, a "timber town" of about nine thousand people in the  Greater Houston metropolitan area and Liberty County. Her father was a former construction worker, unemployed at the time for a year and a half because of a back injury, while her mother was working making change in a slot game room.

The group of perpetrators included students at the local high school, two of whom were members of the basketball team and one the son of a school-board member, and people with criminal records, from selling drugs to robbery and, in one case, manslaughter. They ranged from middle schoolers to one 27-year-old, at the time of the crime.

Discovery
On the Monday after Thanksgiving Day , on 29 November 2010, a cell phone video clip with images of the sexual encounter between a group of males and a young female circulated in the cafeteria of Cleveland's high school. Some viewers recognized the girl as a 6th grader from the middle school next door. A friend of the girl told a teacher what he had seen in the cell-phone video, as a school-district spokeswoman subsequently stated, and the police were alerted.

Investigation
Police investigators identified and contacted the girl, whereupon she said that, over the 2010 Thanksgiving holiday break, she was raped by a group of young men first at a house and then in a mobile home.  According to a search warrant affidavit obtained by the media, police determined the video clip was recorded inside an abandoned mobile home on the city's northern outskirts, next to a Baptist church.  According to the subsequent, criminal indictments, the girl was assaulted on four occasions: the first in September, followed by three more during the fall of 2010.  In January 2011, she was removed by social workers from her parents' home and taken to foster care.

The investigation stirred racial tensions on account of the defendants all being African-Americans and the girl Hispanic, in both the town and nationwide.  The case was covered nationwide in the US and also abroad.

On Monday 4 April 2011,  nineteen defendants appeared in the court of Liberty County district judge Mark Morefield for their arraignment hearing, with six of them pleading "not guilty."

Support for the accused
The New York Times first report focused on the impact of the crime on the Cleveland community. The report came under criticism for its alleged "sympathy" for the accused, to the point where the newspaper sent another reporter back at the place and published a self-critical article.

Quanell X, community leader/activist and head of the New Black Panther Nation, was an "outspoken critic" of the community. In a press conference in front of a Cleveland church, he questioned rhetorically about the accountability of the young girls parents when this happened at 3am and why was "that child experiencing so much sex with so many African-American men" citing the men should be protectors of the family and the community and not raping children. This behavior from the men is unacceptable, the parents should have some type of accountability with the child's whereabout at that time of morning.  He also questioned how the rape claims went unreported, as he put it, "this type of trauma has become so normalized in the community that the girl never actually yelled the word "rape" during the assault and did not make an "outcry". The child had been so desensitized to this type of treatment, until after footage of the assault surfaced. The media reported that the audience "cheered and hollered in agreement." in support that the community needs to be more proactive in community morals and standards.

Florida representative Kathleen Passidomo proposed that the state should step in and regulate the wardrobe of young girls. Pasidomo referred to "an article about an 11 year old girl who was gang-raped in Texas by 18 young men because she was dressed like a 21-year-old prostitute.”

Trials
In Texas, sexual assault against a person under 17 years of age is a second degree felony, and aggravated sexual assault a first degree felony. Eventually, twenty-one people were charged with crimes related to the gang rape. Only two adult males requested trials; one received a 99-year prison sentence, while the other was sentenced to life without parole. Eleven other adult males pleaded guilty to the charges against them and received 15-year sentences in exchange. All seven juveniles entered guilty pleas and received seven-year probated prison-sentences. The twenty-first and last defendant pleaded guilty after a year-long investigation whereby a DNA specimen identified him as being at the crime scene. The defendant received a reduced seven-year sentence in exchange for pleading guilty to indecently exposing himself to a child. All defendants sentenced to prison would be registered as sex offenders for ten years after completing the sentence.

Aftermath
When the investigation started, the victim's family moved to another town after police detectives told the parents that they were in danger, while the  girl who was reported as raped was placed by the Child Protective Services in the care of the Girls' Haven in Beaumont, Texas. In December 2011, she ran away from the residential facility and was "on the streets for about a week," as the Jefferson County prosecutor stated. He revealed that, at some point, she met a 30-year-old male with a prior conviction as a drug dealer in Fort Bend County, who subsequently assaulted her at his apartment in Beaumont. The assailant was arrested and pleaded guilty in September 2012 to aggravated sexual assault of a child in exchange for deferred probation. In 2013, the girl revealed she was pregnant, allegedly from her "15-year old boyfriend," and that they would keep the baby.

See also

Notes

References

External links

2010 in Texas
Gang rape in the United States
Child sexual abuse in the United States
Violence against women in the United States
Rapes in the United States
September 2010 crimes in the United States
November 2010 crimes in the United States
Crime in Texas
Criminal investigation
Incidents of violence against girls
African–Hispanic and Latino American relations
History of women in Texas